Doug Barron is a Scottish former professional footballer and actor who played as a defender. Born in Edinburgh, he played over 300 matches in the Scottish Football League for a total of three clubs.

References

Living people
Scottish footballers
Association football defenders
St Johnstone F.C. players
Clydebank F.C. (1965) players
East Fife F.C. players
Scottish Football League players
Year of birth missing (living people)